Sun Mengran (born 16 July 1992) is a Chinese basketball player for Sichuan Blue Whales and the Chinese national team, where she participated at the 2014 FIBA World Championship.

References

External links

1992 births
Living people
Chinese women's basketball players
Centers (basketball)
Basketball players at the 2016 Summer Olympics
Basketball players at the 2020 Summer Olympics
Olympic basketball players of China
Basketball players from Tianjin
Bayi Kylin players
Asian Games medalists in basketball
Basketball players at the 2018 Asian Games
Asian Games gold medalists for China
Medalists at the 2018 Asian Games